Chesapeake shooting may refer to:

 Murder of Jiansheng Chen, in 2017, grandfather shot by a security guard
 2022 Chesapeake shooting, mass shooting in a Walmart